Tipu Sultan (born 12 September 1998) is a Bangladeshi cricketer. He made his List A debut for Gazi Group Cricketers in the 2017–18 Dhaka Premier Division Cricket League on 17 February 2018. Prior to his List A debut, he was part of Bangladesh's squad for the 2018 Under-19 Cricket World Cup. He made his Twenty20 debut for Shinepukur Cricket Club in the 2018–19 Dhaka Premier Division Twenty20 Cricket League on 25 February 2019. He made his first-class debut for Khulna Division in the 2019–20 National Cricket League on 16 November 2019.

References

External links
 

1998 births
Living people
Bangladeshi cricketers
Gazi Group cricketers
Khulna Division cricketers
Shinepukur Cricket Club cricketers
Place of birth missing (living people)